Bungle is a character in the British children's television series Rainbow. He is a large brown furry bear and is played by various actors, but chiefly Stanley Bates. Bungle is inquisitive but also clumsy, and each show typically represents Bungle involved in a comic dispute with the other puppet characters, Zippy and George, with Geoffrey Hayes mediating. Bungle appears without clothes during the day, but puts pyjamas on to go to bed and has a towel round his waist after a bath.

Character history

Originally, Bungle's face stuck out more, and his belly was white. He also looked more like a bear, but from the second series onwards the crew made him look more cartoon-like because some of the younger viewers were frightened by his realistic appearance. They made his fur more of an orange-brown colour, and his head was enlarged with his face squashed in.

An urban legend holds that one actor (presumably Stanley Bates) playing the role of Bungle was fired after swearing at a child who had deliberately stood on his foot during a live show, although long-time Rainbow contributor Malcolm Lord revealed that Bates chose to stand down before the live shows began in order to concentrate upon scriptwriting, giving Lord the opportunity to portray Bungle himself.

Further reading
 Climbing High: Life Under the Rainbow Exposed by V. S. Ganjabhang and Mike Anderiesz, Pan MacMillan (2002)
 The A-Z of Classic Children's Television by Simon Sheridan, Reynolds & Hearn (2007)
 Rainbow Unzipped: The Shocking Truth about Zippy, George and Bungle - In Their Own Words by Tim Randall, Headline (2009)
 Zippy and Me: My Life Inside Britain’s Most Infamous Puppet by Ronnie LeDrew, Unbound (2019)

References 

Television characters introduced in 1972
Fictional bears
Rainbow (TV series) characters